Bosch is a popular surname in Catalan and Dutch. In both languages it is an archaic spelling of a word (modern Catalan , modern Dutch ) meaning "forest".

Notable people with the surname Bosch include:

In arts, entertainment, and media

In music
 Anabel Bosch (1976-2009), Filipino singer and poet
 Jacques Bosch (1825-1895), Catalan guitarist and song composer
 Jimmy Bosch (b. c. 1960), American jazz and salsa musician
 Leon Bosch (b. 1961), South African double bassist
 Marcus Bosch (b. 1969), German conductor
 Maura Bosch (b. 1958), American composer

In performing arts
 Aurora Bosch (b. 1942), Cuban dancer and ballet teacher
 Francisco Bosch (b. 1982), Spanish actor and dancer
 Johnny Yong Bosch (b. 1976), American television actor and voice actor
 Jordi Bosch (b. 1956), Catalan actor
 Joan Bosch (1925–2015), Catalan movie director
 Lydia Bosch (b. 1963), Spanish actress
 Narcis Bosch, Catalan pornographic director
 Roselyne Bosch (b. 1961), French film producer, director and screenwriter

Visual artists
 Gijs Bosch Reitz (1860-1938), Dutch painter
 Hieronymus Bosch (1450-1516), Dutch painter
 Johannes de Bosch (1713-1785), Dutch painter
 Miguel Jaume y Bosch (1844-1900), Spanish-Uruguayan painter
 Steven Bosch (b. 1978), South African artist

Writers
 Alfred Bosch (born 1962), Catalan author, politician and historian
  (1831-1897), Catalan writer
 Christine de Bosch Kemper (1840-1924), Dutch writer 
 David Bosch (1929-1992), South African missionary and author
 Hieronymus de Bosch (1740-1811), Dutch poet and Latin scholar
 Juan Bosch (1909-2001), Dominican politician and writer
 Pseudonymous Bosch, author of the Secret Series children's books
 Xavier Bosch i Sancho (b. 1967), Catalan writer and journalist

In business
 Anthony Bosch, founder of Biogenesis of America medical clinic
 Felipe A. Bosch Gutierrez (b. 1962), Guatemalan businessman
 George Henry Bosch (1861–1934), Australian merchant and philanthropist 
 Henry Bosch (b. 1931), Australian businessman and governance advocate
 José Manuel Lara Bosch (1946–2015), Spanish media executive and businessman
 Joseph Bosch (1850–1937), German-born American brewer
 Juan Luis Bosch Gutiérrez (b. 1952), Guatemalan businessman
 Robert Bosch (1861–1942), German industrialist and inventor, founder of Robert Bosch GmbH
 Robert Bosch Jr. (1928–2004), German billionaire

In government, politics, and military
 Albert H. Bosch (1908-2005), American politician
  (1746-1803), Dutch politician and poet
 Ernesto Bosch (1863-1951), Argentine Foreign Minister and Central Bank official
 Francisco Milans del Bosch (1769-1834), Spanish general
 Hugo von Bosch (1782–1865), Bavarian Lieutenant General and Acting War Minister
 Jaime Milans del Bosch (1915-1997), Spanish general
 Jaume Bosch (b. 1953), Catalan politician
 Jeltje de Bosch Kemper (1836–1916), Dutch feminist
 Juan Bosch (1909-2001), Dominican politician and writer
  (1884–1953), Dutch jurist and politician
 Milagros Ortiz Bosch (b. 1936), Dominican politician
 Orlando Bosch (1926-2011), Cuban exile and terrorist
 Yevgenia Bosch (1879-1925), Ukrainian Bolshevik activist and politician

In science
 Carl Bosch (1874-1940), German chemist, Nobel laureate, and engineer
 Irene Bosch, Venezuelan biologist and researcher
 Jan Bosch (b. 1967), Dutch computer scientist 
 Leendert Bosch (1924–2017), Dutch biochemist
 Pere Bosch-Gimpera (1891-1974), Catalan-born Mexican archaeologist and anthropologist
 Robert A. Bosch (b. 1963), Author and recreational mathematician
 Siegfried Bosch (b. 1944), German mathematician

In sport
 Anneke Bosch (b. 1990s), South African cricketer
 Christopher Bosch (b. 1992), South African rugby player
 Crisant Bosch (1907-1981), Catalan footballer
 Clayton Bosch (b. 1992), South African cricketer
 Corbin Bosch (b. 1997), South African cricketer
 Curwin Bosch (b. 1997), South African rugby player
 Don Bosch (b. 1942), American baseball player
 Dylan Bosch (b. 1998), South African swimmer
 Eathan Bosch (b. 1997), South African cricketer
 Edith Bosch (born 1980), Dutch judoka
 Emma Bosch (1971–1994), Catalan alpine skier
 Facundo Bosch (b. 1991), Argentine rugby player
 Frank Bosch (b. 1945), American football player
 Gerard Bosch van Drakestein (1887–1972), Dutch track cyclist
 Hermann Bosch (1891-1916), German footballer
  (b. 1964), Dutch racing car driver
 Jurjen Bosch (b. 1985), Dutch footballer
 Manel Bosch (b. 1967), Catalan basketball player
 Marcelo Bosch (b. 1984), Argentine rugby player
 Mariano Bosch (b. 1962), Argentine rugby player and coach
 Mónica Bosch (b. 1972), Catalan alpine skier
 Nadir Bosch (b. 1973), French middle-distance runner
 Patrick Bosch (1964-2012), Dutch footballer
 Paul Bosch (b. 1984), South African rugby union player
 Ruud Bosch (b. 1984), Dutch badminton player
 Tertius Bosch (1966-2000), South African cricketer

Other people
 Mariette Bosch (1950–2001), South African executed for murder by Botswana
Mineke Bosch (born 1954), Dutch historian

See also
Bösch, surname
Boesch, surname
Van den Bosch, Dutch surname

Catalan-language surnames
Dutch-language surnames
German-language surnames
Toponymic surnames